The National Football League 50th Anniversary All-Time Team was selected in 1969 by Pro Football Hall of Fame voters from each franchise city of the National Football League (NFL) to honor the greatest players of the first 50 years of the league.  A total of 16 players were named, including 15 position winners and one special "legend" category for Jim Thorpe, who was described "as the star that never diminishes." At the time, all but three of the players had played in 20 prior years; four were on NFL rosters at the time of the selections: Johnny Unitas, Gale Sayers, John Mackey, and Ray Nitschke. Additionally, two runners-up were also named for each of the 15 positions.

Seven of the sixteen players from the 50th Anniversary All-Time Team also made the NFL 75th Anniversary All-Time Team: Johnny Unitas, Jim Brown, Gale Sayers, Don Hutson, Gino Marchetti, Ray Nitschke, and Dick "Night Train" Lane.

Eleven of the sixteen players from the 50th Anniversary All-Time Team also made the NFL 100th Anniversary All-Time Team: Johnny Unitas, Jim Brown, Gale Sayers, Don Hutson, Elroy Hirsch, John Mackey, Cal Hubbard, Chuck Bednarik, Gino Marchetti, Dick "Night Train" Lane, and Emlen Tunnell.

With Jerry Kramer making the Hall of Fame class of 2018, all members of the 50th Anniversary All-Time Team have been inducted into the Pro Football Hall of Fame.

Offense
Source:

Defense
Source:

Special teams
Source:

Runners-up 
Two runners-up were selected for each of the 15 positions as follows: 

QB: Sammy Baugh and Norm Van Brocklin; FB: Bronko Nagurski and Joe Perry; HB: Harold Grange and Hugh McElhenny; SE: Raymond Berry and Dante Lavelli; FL: Boyd Dowler and Lenny Moore;  TE: Mike Ditka and Ron Kramer; OT: Forrest Gregg and Joe Stydahar; G: Dan Fortmann and Jim Parker; C: Mel Hein and Alex Wojciechowicz; DE: Len Ford and Deacon Jones; DT: Art Donovan and Ernie Stautner; LB:  Joe Schmidt and Clyde Turner; CB: Herb Adderley and Jack Butler, S: Jack Christiansen and Larry Wilson; PK: Ernie Nevers and Ken Strong.

See also
National Football League 75th Anniversary All-Time Team
National Football League All-Decade Teams

Notes

References

50th Anniversary All-Time Team